Hugo Andrew Hollas (November 30, 1945September 6, 1995) was a professional American football safety in the National Football League. He played four seasons for the New Orleans Saints and the San Francisco 49ers.

1945 births
1995 deaths
People from Schulenburg, Texas
Players of American football from Texas
American football safeties
Rice Owls football players
Dallas Cowboys players
New Orleans Saints players
San Francisco 49ers players